Muysky District (Muyayn aimag) is an administrative and municipal district (raion), one of the twenty-one in the Republic of Buryatia, Russia. It is located in the northeast of the republic. Its administrative center is the urban locality (an urban-type settlement) of Taksimo. As of the 2010 Census, the total population of the district was 13,142, with the population of Taksimo accounting for 71.8% of that number.

History
The district was established on October 23, 1989 from parts of the territories of Bauntovsky and Severo-Baykalsky Districts.

Administrative and municipal status
Within the framework of administrative divisions, Muysky District is one of the twenty-one in the Republic of Buryatia. It is divided into two urban-type settlements (administrative divisions with the administrative centers, correspondingly, in the urban-type settlements (inhabited localities) of Severomuysk and Taksimo) and two selsoviets, which comprise six rural localities. As a municipal division, the district is incorporated as Muysky Municipal District. Severomuysk Urban-Type Settlement is incorporated as an urban settlement within the municipal district. The other urban settlement within the municipal district incorporates two administrative divisions—Taksimo Urban-Type Settlement and Bambuysky Selsoviet. The remaining selsoviet is incorporated as a rural settlement within the municipal district. The urban-type settlement of Taksimo serves as the administrative center of both the administrative and municipal district.

References

Notes

Sources

Districts of Buryatia
States and territories established in 1989
 
